José Omar Torres López was a Cuban artist born in Matanzas, Cuba, in 1953. His main fields were painting, engraving, and drawing. He is Director of the Taller Experimental de Gráfica (TEG), Havana, Cuba.

Education
Between 1968 and 1973 he studied at the Escuela Nacional de Arte (ENA), Havana. Between 1975 and 1976 he studied a Post-graduate course on lithography with professors Luis Miguel Valdés, José Contino and José Luis Posada, in Havana. In 1976 to 1978 he studied Art History in Havana University. From 1987 to 1989 he studied engraving at the Instituto Superior de Arte (ISA) in Havana.

Individual exhibitions
Among his must important solo exhibitions were Temperas de José Omar Torres, in Galería L, Havana, 1973. In 1992 he exhibited Jose Omar Torres''' in the Galerie Itinerat, in Paris, France. In 1995 he presented 3 Propuestas (Pintura Cubana) [Eduardo Abela Torrás, José Omar Torres, Carlos del Toro Orihuela] in the Galería de Arte INAC, Plaza de Francia, Panama. In 1997 he exhibited Polos opuestos [José Gómez Fresquet (FREMEZ)/José Omar Torres] in the Ambos Mundos Hotel, Havana.

Collective exhibitions
He was part of collective exhibitions such as the International Print Biennale Cracow 1976, in Krakow, Poland. In 1991 he participated in Grabado Contemporáneo Cubano at the Fourth Havana biennial in the Museo de Arte Colonial, Havana. In 1994 he was included in  La Jeune Peinture Cubaine, at the Maison de la Culture du Lametin, Fort de France, Martinique. In 1995 he participated in the Feria Internacional de Arte, in the World Trade Center/Centro Internacional de Exposiciones y Convenciones, Mexico City, Mexico. In 1999 he was one of the selected artists to be shown in Afro-Cuban Contemporary Graphic Art at The Kennedy Center, Washington, D.C.

Awards
In 1973 he won Third Prize in the Salón Nacional de Grabado, Galería Oriente, Santiago de Cuba. In 1974 he gained Second Prize at the II Salón Provincial de Profesores e Instructores de Artes Plásticas, Museo Nacional de Bellas Artes, in Havana. In 1974 he also won Third Prize in Lithography in the Segundo Salón Nacional de Grabados, Galería Amelia Peláez, Parque Lenin, in Havana. In 1999 he was recognized with the title of the Resident Artist, Brandywine Workshop, Philadelphia, in Pennsylvania.

Collections
His works can be found in the Biblioteca Nacional José Martí, in Havana; in the Lehigh University Art Galleries (LUAG), in Bethlehem, Pennsylvania; in the Museo Nacional de Bellas Artes, Havana; and in the Taller Experimental de Gráfica (TEG), Havana.

References

  Jose Veigas-Zamora, Cristina Vives Gutierrez, Adolfo V. Nodal, Valia Garzon, Dannys Montes de Oca. Memoria: Cuban Art of the 20th Century. California/International Arts Foundation, 2001. 
 Jose Viegas. Memoria: Artes Visuales Cubanas Del Siglo Xx''. California International Arts, 2004.   

Cuban contemporary artists
Living people
1953 births